Panagopoulos is a Greek surname. Notable people with the surname include:

Andreas Panagopoulos (1883–1952), Greek politician
Costas Panagopoulos, American political scientist
Leonidas Panagopoulos (born 1987), Greek footballer
Nicolas Panagopoulos (born 1954), Greek composer
Panayotis Panagopoulos (1916–unknown), Greek chess player
Pericles Panagopoulos (born 1935), Greek shipping magnate

Greek-language surnames